The Authorization for Use of Military Force Against Iraq Resolution (short title) or Joint Resolution to authorize the use of United States Armed Forces pursuant to United Nations Security Council Resolution 678 (official title), was the United States Congress's January 14, 1991, authorization of the use of U.S. military force in the Gulf War.

President George H. W. Bush requested a Congressional joint resolution on January 8, 1991, one week before the January 15, 1991, deadline issued to Iraq specified by the November 29, 1990 United Nations United Nations Security Council Resolution 678. President Bush had deployed over 500,000 U.S. troops without Congressional authorization to Saudi Arabia and the Persian Gulf region in the preceding five months in response to Iraq's August 2, 1990 invasion of Kuwait.

Legislative history 

Senate Joint Resolution 2 was approved in the United States Senate on January 12, 1991, by a vote of 52 to 47.
  was sponsored by John Warner (R) with 34 cosponsors — 29 Republicans and 5 Democrats. (The Democrats were: Howell Heflin, Bennett Johnston, Joe Lieberman, Chuck Robb, and Richard Shelby).
 Approved 52–47 at 2:44 PM EST on Saturday, January 12, 1991.
 Democrats: 10–45. 10 (18%) of 56 Democratic Senators voted for the resolution: John Breaux, Richard Bryan, Al Gore, Bob Graham, Howell Heflin, Bennett Johnston, Joe Lieberman, Harry Reid, Chuck Robb, Richard Shelby
 Republicans: 42–2. Chuck Grassley and Mark Hatfield voted against the resolution.

House Joint Resolution 77 was approved in the United States House of Representatives on January 12, 1991, by a vote of 250 to 183
  was sponsored by House Minority Leader Bob Michel (R) with 31 cosponsors — 14 Republicans and 17 Democrats (The Democrats were: Gary Ackerman, Les Aspin, Howard Berman, Dante Fascell, Tom Lantos, Greg Laughlin (R), Mel Levine, Marilyn Lloyd, Dave McCurdy, Charles Thomas McMillen, Gillespie V. Montgomery, John Murtha, Ike Skelton, Stephen J. Solarz, Charles Stenholm, Robert Torricelli, and Harold Volkmer).
 Approved: 250–183 at 3:51 PM EST on Saturday, January 12, 1991.
 Democrats: 86–179. 86 (32%) of 267 Democrats voted for the resolution.
 Mervyn M. Dymally and Mo Udall were ill and did not vote, but would have voted against the resolution.
 Republicans: 164–3. Reps. Silvio Conte, Connie Morella, Frank Riggs voted against the resolution.
 Independent: 0–1. Rep. Bernie Sanders (I) voted against the resolution.
 House Joint Resolution 77 was then approved by the Senate by unanimous consent.
 House Joint Resolution 77 was signed by President George H. W. Bush on January 14, 1991, and became .

Repeal
On June 29, 2021, the U.S. House of Representatives voted 366–46 to repeal the authorization along with the 1957 authorization, and now currently awaits further action in the Senate.

See also
 United Nations Security Council Resolution 660
 United Nations Security Council Resolution 678

References

External links
 Authorization for Use of Military Force Against Iraq Resolution as enacted (details) in the US Statutes at Large
 Bill status and summary on Congress.gov

1991 in law
United States foreign relations legislation
United States and the United Nations
1991 in international relations
United States congressional resolutions passed both by House and Senate
Iraq–United States relations
Gulf War